Tolerx, Inc. was a biopharmaceutical company headquartered in Cambridge, Massachusetts.  The company was focused on discovering and developing new therapies designed to treat patients by reprogramming the immune system, allowing for long-term remission of immune-related diseases after a short course of therapy. Targeted diseases include type 1 diabetes, rheumatoid arthritis, Inflammatory bowel disease (IBD), cancer, chronic and viral diseases. In 2008, Tolerx was named one of Fierce Biotech’s Fierce 15. In October 2011, Tolerx was shut down due to an unsuccessful  Phase III trial in patients recently diagnosed with Type 1 diabetes.

Development programs

Tolerx’s lead product candidate, otelixizumab, also known as TRX4, is a novel monoclonal antibody being developed for the treatment of autoimmune type 1 diabetes and other autoimmune diseases. The efficacy and safety of otelixizumab in the treatment of type 1 diabetes is currently being studied in a pivotal Phase 3 study called DEFEND (Durable-response therapy Evaluation For Early or New-onset type 1 Diabetes). Tolerx entered into a collaboration with Glaxo SmithKline in October 2007 relating to the development and commercialization of otelixizumab. Otelixizumab has been granted Orphan Drug Status by the U.S. Food and Drug Administration.

Additionally, in collaboration with Genentech, Tolerx is developing a modified version of TRX1, a humanized monoclonal antibody that binds to the CD4 receptor found on both T effector and T regulatory cells. The safety and activity of TRX1 was evaluated by Tolerx in a single-dose, placebo-controlled, double-blind Phase 1 clinical trial.  The data from the Phase 1 clinical trial showed TRX1 was well tolerated, did not deplete T cells, and had no observed first-dose side effect. The modified version of TRX1, designated MTRX1011A, is being developed for the treatment of autoimmune diseases, which may include rheumatoid arthritis, cutaneous lupus erythematosus (CLE), multiple sclerosis (MS), and systemic lupus erythematosus (SLE).

The Tolerx pipeline also includes two pre-clinical candidates: TRX518, an antibody directed to GITR (glucocorticoid-induced tumor necrosis factor receptor), a surface receptor molecule that has been shown to be involved in inhibiting the suppressive activity of T regulatory cells and extending the survival of T effector cells, and TRX385, a monoclonal antibody that recognizes ILT3, an inhibitory receptor expressed by dendritic cells and monocytes.  These pre-clinical candidates may be developed for the treatment of cancer and viral diseases.

Leadership

Herman Waldmann, PhD, FRCPath, MRCP, FRS, FMedSci, Co-Founder, Chairman, Scientific Advisory Board, Professor of Pathology, Head of the Sir William Dunn School of Pathology and Clinical Director of the Therapeutic Antibody Centre (TAC), University of Oxford

“A pioneer in the field of monoclonal antibody production”

Douglas J. Ringler, VMD, Co-Founder, President & CEO

Louis Vaickus, MD
Chief Medical Officer

Thomas A. Shea, MBA
Chief Financial Officer

References

Biotechnology companies of the United States
Defunct companies based in Massachusetts
Companies based in Cambridge, Massachusetts
Pharmaceutical companies established in 2000
Pharmaceutical companies disestablished in 2011
Privately held companies based in Massachusetts